Asa "Ace" Stewart (February 14, 1869 – April 17, 1912) was a Major League Baseball player. Stewart played for the Chicago Colts in the  season. He batted and threw right-handed.

Stewart died in his home town of Terre Haute, Indiana in 1912 of uremia.

References

External links

Major League Baseball second basemen
Chicago Colts players
1869 births
1912 deaths
Baseball players from Indiana
19th-century baseball players
Minor league baseball managers
Terre Haute (minor league baseball) players
Oconto (minor league baseball) players
Fond du Lac (minor league baseball) players
Oshkosh Indians players
Montgomery Colts players
Easton Dutchmen players
Sioux City Cornhuskers players
Rockford Forest City players
Rockford Reds players
Indianapolis Hoosiers (minor league) players
Indianapolis Indians players
Terre Haute Hottentots players
Kansas City Blues (baseball) players
Memphis Egyptians players
Omaha Omahogs players
Omaha Indians players
Peoria Distillers players
New Orleans Pelicans (baseball) players
Iola Grays players
Cherryvale Boosters players
Meridian Ribboners players
Columbus Discoverers players
Peru (minor league baseball) players